Katarzyna Keahey is a Senior Computer Scientist at Argonne National Laboratory and the Consortium for Advanced Science and Engineering (CASE) of the University of Chicago. She is a Principal Investigator (PI) of the Chameleon project, which provides an innovative experimentation platform for computer science systems experiments. She created Nimbus, one of the first open source implementations of infrastructure-as-a-Service (IaaS), and co-founded the  SoftwareX journal, publishing software as a scientific instrument.

Education
Keahey attended the Gdańsk University of Technology where she obtained her magister inżynier in informatics in 1992. She received her M.S. in computer science at Indiana University in 1994, and later went on to earn her Ph.D. in computer science at Indiana University in 1998. Her Ph.D. dissertation was titled, An Architecture for Application-Level Parallel Distributed Computation, and was supervised by Dennis Gannon.

Research
Her research interests include cloud computing,  resource management,  in particular the exploration of how cloud and high-performance/scientific resources can co-exist and complement each other, infrastructure operation, and  Internet of Things (IoT)/cloud continuum. She is currently developing methods that support capturing, replicating, and publishing experiments digitally.

References 	

Indiana University alumni
American computer scientists
Women computer scientists
Gdańsk University of Technology alumni
Polish computer scientists
University of Chicago faculty
Polish emigrants to the United States
Place of birth missing (living people)
Year of birth missing (living people)
Living people